KA Bunga Mas Enam (BM6) is a container freighter purchased by the Royal Malaysian Navy and converted into an auxiliary ship. She is the second ship after KA Bunga Mas Lima (BM5).

Development
Like her sister ship Bunga Mas Lima, Bunga Mas Enam was also a 699 TEUs container vessel where she is the second-listed Malaysian trading vessel that has been renovated and equipped with security equipment and weapons in order to protect and accompany MISC ships carrying national interests in the Gulf of Aden waters and surrounding waters. The renovation work was carried out by MMHE (a subsidiary of MISC) at its shipyard in Pasir Gudang, Johor. Bunga Mas Enam also patrols the Malaysian exclusive economic zone especially in Sabah to ensure the peace in Malaysia water.

References

1997 ships
Bunga Mas Lima-class auxiliary ships
Ships built in Malaysia